Ixora pudica is a species of flowering plant in the family Rubiaceae. It is endemic to Seychelles.

References

External links
World Checklist of Rubiaceae

pudica
Flora of Seychelles
Vulnerable plants
Endemic flora of Seychelles
Taxonomy articles created by Polbot